Gerard Ellis (born 25 October 1993) was a Welsh rugby union player who played  as a loose head.

Ellis made his debut for Coventry in 2019. having previously played for London Irish, Dragons and Llandovery RFC.

References

External links 
Dragons profile

Welsh rugby union players
Dragons RFC players
Living people
1992 births
Llandovery RFC players
London Scottish F.C. players
London Irish players